Bejjur is a mandal in Komaram Bheem district in the state of Telangana in India.

Demographics
According to Indian census, 2001, the demographic details of Bejjur mandal is as follows:
 Total Population:  42,796 in 8,973 Households.  
 Male Population:  21,356 and Female Population:  21,440  
 Children Under 6-years of age: 7,546 (Boys - 3,760 and Girls - 3,786)
 Total Literates:  11,240

References 

Mandals in Komaram Bheem district